Shandana Minhas (born 26 October 1975, in Karachi, Pakistan) is a Pakistani writer.

Personal life 

Shandana Minhas is the third of three children born to Mary (née Khan) and Safdar Minhas. Coming from an interfaith background, Minhas has written extensively about Pakistani society.

She was part of the resurgence in Pakistani media in the early 2000s, heading creative development for the Manduck Collective, Pakistan's first independent production house, and writing for local papers.

The social and political landscape of Pakistan informs much of her work. Minhas has written about the difficulty as a Pakistani writer living through these times of remaining “a simple storyteller.” She has three children.

Writing 

Minhas is an Honorary Fellow in Writing of the International Writing Program at the University of Iowa. She set up Mongrel Books in Pakistan in 2016. Minhas has an MA in Prose Fiction from UEA and was the recipient of the Malcolm Bradbury Memorial Scholarship.

Books 

Minhas's first novel,Tunnel Vision (2007), is a first-person meditation on life as a woman in a man's world. It was shortlisted for the Commonwealth Writers’ Prize, adapted for the stage by The Madras Players in 2009, and published in Italian as Pakistan Graffiti in 2012. It has been described as “piercingly witty and acutely perceptive” and a “silent bestseller”.

Her second novel, Survival Tips for Lunatics (2014), is a “bitingly funny” adventure in which a bickering couple accidentally leaves their two sons behind on a camping trip in Pakistan's turbulent Balochistan province. Alongside critical acclaim, it became the first children's book to win a general fiction prize in the region, taking the French Embassy's Karachi Literature Festival fiction prize (honouring the best writing by a Pakistani or a writer of Pakistani origin worldwide) in 2015.

Minhas's third novel, Daddy’s Boy (2016), tells the story of Asfandyar Ikram, who has no idea that his father is alive - until the day he learns of his death. The book was well-reviewed by The Hindustan Times (“…as hilarious as it is touching; one that’s totally bizarre while also being relatable”),Open Magazine (“The tension builds, tightening like a stretched elastic band, until the shocking denouement, which casts ambiguity on the very title of the book. Starting on a note of laughter, the ending of this gripping novel elicits a gasp of horror”), and multiple other publications. On the cover blurb, Pakistani author Mohammed Hanif called Daddy's Boy “heartbreaking and hilarious”.

Her fourth book, the novella Rafina (2018), was described in Dawn as “a stark portrayal of the lengths a young, ambitious and somewhat desperate young woman has to go to in order to fulfil her dreams and get financial security.” Minhas originally wrote the book in 2004.

Other works 

Minhas is primarily a novelist but has also written for stage, screen and opinion pages. Her short story, The New Woman in the Old Flat, was published in the Griffith Review’s ‘New Asia Now’ issue showcasing “outstanding young writers from the countries at the centre of Asia’s ongoing transformation”, in 2015. Other stories have appeared in literary magazines such as The Indian Quarterly, and A Pakistani Homecoming was published in Dawn, the country's most widely read newspaper, to mark the 70th anniversary of Independence.

Since 1997, Minhas has been a regular contributor to Pakistani and international publications. Her columns and essays have been featured in the Herald, The Express Tribune, EPW and DNA India. She has scripted several documentary films, with subjects covering human rights, environmental and development issues in Karachi, and Balochistan. She wrote and co-directed with Maheen Zia, in 2003, a short film about the murders of Shia doctors in Pakistan.

References 

English-language writers from Pakistan
Living people

1975 births